Hestnes is a surname. Notable people with the surname include:

Egil Hestnes (born 1943), Norwegian politician
Jonas Hestnes (1869–1926), Norwegian newspaper editor and politician

See also
Hestenes

Norwegian-language surnames